is a Japanese football player for Tochigi Uva FC.

Playing career
Koki Wakasugi was born in Yamanashi Prefecture. He joined to his local club, Ventforet Kofu, in 2014. On June 3, 2015, he debuted in the J.League Cup (v Sanfrecce Hiroshima). In June 2015, he moved to Saurcos Fukui.

Club statistics
Updated to 23 February 2018.

References

External links

Profile at Ventforet Kofu

1995 births
Living people
Association football people from Yamanashi Prefecture
Japanese footballers
J1 League players
Ventforet Kofu players
Saurcos Fukui players
Tochigi City FC players
Association football midfielders